Ron Wallace is an American poet, and Felix Pollak Professor of Poetry & Halls-Bascom Professor of English at the University of Wisconsin-Madison.

Life
He graduated from College of Wooster with a BS, and from the University of Michigan, with a PhD.

Works
For a Limited Time Only, University of Pittsburgh Press, 2008, 
Now You See It, Parallel Press, 2006, 
Long for This World, University of Pittsburgh Press, 2003, 
The Uses of Adversity, University of Pittsburgh Press, 1998, 
Time's Fancy, University of Pittsburgh Press, 1994, 
The Makings of Happiness, University of Pittsburgh Press, 1991, 
People and Dog in the Sun, University of Pittsburgh Press, 1987, 
Tunes for Bears to Dance To, University of Pittsburgh Press, 1983, 
Plums, Stones, Kisses & Hooks, University of Missouri Press, 1983, 

 Short stories
Quick Bright Things; Mid-List Press, 2000, 
Editor

Vital Signs, University of Wisconsin Press, 1989,

References

External links
official website

Living people
College of Wooster alumni
University of Michigan alumni
Place of birth missing (living people)
Year of birth missing (living people)
University of Wisconsin–Madison faculty
Poets from Wisconsin